A Tale of Legendary Libido is a 2008 South Korean comedy film directed and written by Shin Han-sol starring Bong Tae-gyu, Kim Shin-ah, and Oh Dal-su released on April 30, 2008.

Plot 
Byeon Gang-soe is a meek rice cake seller in a remote mountainous village in Joseon Dynasty Korea. Mocked for his impaired libido, Gang-so learns of a potion buried in the forest which transforms him into the greatest lover in his village.

Cast 
 Bong Tae-gyu ... Byeon Gang-soe
 Kim Shin-ah ... Dal-gaeng
 Oh Dal-su ... Kang-mok
 Youn Yuh-jung ... Old woman
 Song Jae-ho ... Old monk
 Jeon Soo-kyung ... Hostel owner
 Kwon Byeong-gil ... High official
 Lee Jung-sub ... District magistrate
 Kim Ki-hyeon ... Blind physician
 Seo Yeong ... Dan-bi
 Kim Ki-doo

Release 
A Tale of Legendary Libido was released in South Korea on 30 April 2008, and was ranked sixth at the box office on its opening weekend with 89,997 admissions.

References

External links 
 
 
 

2008 films
2000s Korean-language films
South Korean sex comedy films
Showbox films
2000s South Korean films